Volt Portugal is a progressive and Eurofederalist party in Portugal. It is affiliated with Volt Europa and was officially registered in June 2020 as the 25th party in the country. Volt has contested several local elections and participated in the 2022 national parliamentary elections.

Policies 
After the founding of the parent organisation, Volt Europe, the "5+1 Challenges" were adopted, which define the fundamental challenges that the party sees. This was followed by the European policy document Mapping of Policies, which forms the basis for the creation of all of Volt's programmes.

Since then, several documents have been added to the Mapping of Policies. Together with the Mapping of Policies, these thematically limited documents form the so-called Policy Portfolio, from which all national, regional and local programmes are derived.

On 18 December 2021, the party presented its election manifesto for the 2022 parliamentary elections.

Program 
In its program for the 2022 general election, Volt proposes electoral reform, the creation of administrative regions in Portugal to put more focus on the development of Portugal's interior, which the party says has been forgotten, and to hold a referendum on this.

Social policy and culture 
In the area of health care, the party advocates the reduction of waiting lists and criticises the state of the National Health Service, low salaries and the slipping to minimum wage levels of employees and lack of rest days despite high workloads.

The party advocates the legalization of prostitution, soft drug trafficking, passive euthanasia, and assisted suicide. Altruistic surrogacy arrangements are also to be legalised, and the extent to which the black market can be combated by legalising surrogacy arrangements of a commercial nature is to be investigated. The party is in favour of equal rights for men and women with regard to the right of abortion.

The party advocates equality in parental leave and free crèches and kindergartens. Investment in better training for police forces should be increased, ethnic profiling and police violence should be ended.

Volt wants to improve culture and access for young people by introducing and awarding culture vouchers worth €200. Jewish life in Portugal and the Sephardic community should be supported and the application process for Portuguese citizenship of the Diaspora should be made more transparent.

The introduction of an unconditional basic income is to be explored.

Climate policy 
Volt sees climate protection as one of the most urgent challenges and wants to work towards the goal of decarbonising the energy supply in Portugal and the EU by 2035 and achieving carbon neutrality for the whole of Portugal by 2040. In order to combat climate change, Volt advocates the abolition of subsidies for fossil fuels and the inclusion of nuclear power in the European Union's green taxonomy. Volt also sees the expansion of rail infrastructure and combating desertification in Portugal as an important element of climate policy in this context. In addition, investments will be made in the energy efficiency of houses to combat climate change and increase the safety of people in situations with extreme temperatures. Subsidies for fossil fuels should be reduced and the financial resources freed up should be invested in the expansion of the public transport sector and a carbon-neutral mobility system.

Digital policy 
A ministry for digitalisation is to be created to bundle expertise at state level. This is intended not only to promote the restructuring of the state apparatus, but also to combat fake news and cybercrime and help to reduce bureaucracy.

Economic and fiscal policy 
The party supports a reduction in corporate tax for companies that pay high wages and the introduction of new taxes, especially on unhealthy foods and medicines without scientifically proven benefits. Labour law is to be harmonised with that of the European Union and a whistleblower system to combat corruption is to be established. Unemployment benefits are to be extended and incentives for remote work are to be provided.

Volt aims to promote regional industrial clusters by fostering dialogue between entrepreneurs, universities, trade unions and public institutions.

Electoral reform 
In response to the problems in the 2022 parliamentary election, Volt called for a reform of postal voting and proposes the testing and introduction of digital voting, as is already possible in Belgium, Estonia and France. The aim is to avoid frequent mistakes in postal voting that lead to invalid votes and to speed up the counting process, as well as to reduce the costs of the election. In addition, the hurdles to participation in the election are to be lowered.

Elections

Local elections 2021 
In the 2021 Portuguese local elections, the party contested in Lisbon (0.58%), Porto (0.42%), Tomar (1.36%), Coimbra (coalition 43.92%) and Oeiras (coalition 7.57%), winning one mandate in Coimbra. Independent MEP Francisco Guerreiro supported the party in the local elections.

Parliamentary election 2022 
In the 2022 Portuguese legislative election, Volt Portugal contested a national election for the first time, being eligible in 19 out of 22 districts. The campaign's slogan is "Volt és tu" (Volt is you). The party's goal is to achieve the most votes of the parties not previously represented in parliament and two mandates. The party earned 0.1% of the vote and no seats. The party achieved its best result in the constituency of European foreign countries. After 80.32% of the ballots in the European constituency were declared invalid and a complaint by Volt to the Constitutional Court, the Court declared the election in the constituency invalid and ordered a rerun.

History 
Volt has been present in Portugal since December 2017 and, like other national offshoots of Volt Europe in Portugal, initially planned to participate in the European elections, but failed to obtain the required 7500 supporter signatures. On 9 October 2019, the movement then submitted over 9000 signatures to be officially recognised as a party in Portugal. After several delays and amendments to the constitution required by the Constitutional Court, the Constitutional Court finally made the decision to officially recognise Volt Portugal as a party on 25 June 2020. This makes Volt the 25th party in the country and 14th registered section of Volt Europa recognised as a national party.

Due to the delays, the party was not able to contest the Azores elections in autumn 2020, contrary to what was initially promised.

In the September 2021 local elections, the party contested an election for the first time in its history, winning a mandate in Coimbra. Independent MEP Francisco Guerreiro supported the party in the local elections. At Volt Europa's general assembly in October 2021, Volt and Guerreiro announced that the currently independent MEP would join the party after his mandate expired.

In January 2022, the party contested national parliamentary elections for the first time. It achieved 0.1% and fell one mandate short.

In May 2022, the founder and first president of Volt Portugal, Tiago Matos Gomes, resigned and left the party. The reason he gave was ideological differences with other members. Volt's National Council President Miguel Duarte took over as interim president.

On 25 and 26 June 2022, the 2nd National Congress of Volt Portugal was held in Setúbal, where the new internal organs of the party were elected. Ana Carvalho and Duarte Costa were elected President and Vice-President, respectively, to lead the National Political Commission. At its 3rd National Congress on 21 January 2023, the party decided to include in its statutes a model of joint leadership by two persons of different sexes as party leaders, which it had already been following since the previous Congress, making it the first party in Portugal to introduce such a model. However, the decision still has to be confirmed by the Constitutional Court.

External links 
 Website Volt Portugal

References 

Portugal
Political parties in Portugal
Political parties established in 2020
2020 establishments in Portugal
Organisations based in Lisbon
Pro-European political parties in Portugal
Centrist parties in Portugal